The 97th edition of the Milano–Torino cycling classic was held on 28 September 2016. The race was won by Colombian rider Miguel Ángel López after a late attack on the Superga hill. Canadian Michael Woods was second, Rigoberto Urán third.

Teams
Eighteen teams of up to eight riders started the race:

Result

References

2016 UCI Europe Tour
2016 in Italian sport
Milano–Torino